The Colonial Office Visual Instruction Committee (COVIC) was a scheme by the British Colonial Office to publish lantern-slide lectures about the British Empire. Established in 1902, COVIC was discontinued after World War I, though COVIC photographs continued to circulate in school classrooms until 1945.

Papers relating to COVIC are held at Cambridge University Library.

References

History of photography
1902 establishments in the British Empire